Finest Selection: The Greatest Hits is the first greatest hits album by British-Irish girl group The Saturdays. It was released on 11 August 2014, through Polydor Records. The album includes all 17 of their singles released from the albums Chasing Lights (2008), Wordshaker (2009), Headlines! (2010), On Your Radar (2011) and Living for the Weekend (2013) as well as three new songs, "What Are You Waiting For?", "808" and "Walking Through the Desert".

Upon release, debuted at number ten on the UK Albums Chart, giving The Saturdays their fifth top-ten album in the UK. The album spent four weeks inside the UK Top 100. To date, it is the last release from the group who went on hiatus in 2014.

Promotion

Singles
"What Are You Waiting For?" was released on 10 August 2014, as the album's lead single.

Track listing

Notes
 denotes additional production by
 denotes assistant production by
 denotes vocal production by

Charts and certifications

Charts

Certifications

Release history

References

2014 greatest hits albums
The Saturdays albums
Polydor Records compilation albums